Total Recall 2070 is a science fiction television series influenced by the work of Philip K. Dick. It was first broadcast in 1999 on the Canadian television channel CHCH-TV and later the same year on the American Showtime channel. It was later syndicated in the United States with some editing to remove scenes of nudity, violence and (in most cases) strong language.

The series was filmed in Toronto, Ontario. It was a Canadian/German co-production. A single season consisting of 22 episodes was produced.

Production
Total Recall 2070 was created by Art Monterastelli. The series is named after the 1990 film Total Recall, loosely based on Philip K. Dick's short story "We Can Remember It for You Wholesale", but it has been noted as sharing no major plot points or characters with it, other than the Rekall company and the concept of virtual vacations. Instead, a much larger influence in its plot elements and especially visual style has been recognized to be the 1982 film Blade Runner, itself a loose adaptation of Dick's novel Do Androids Dream of Electric Sheep?. Series creator Art Monterastelli has admitted the stronger influence of Blade Runner over Total Recall, and explained, he thought doing a paranoid psychological thriller with a strong visual background reminiscent of Blade Runner, would be a better use of their limited budget, provide more creative opportunities to the writers, and even be more in line with the spirit of Dick's antihero storylines as found in his body of work, compared to the Total Recall action film. Despite the influence of his works to the series production, Dick is not credited on the series main or end titles.

Most of this series was filmed at the Downsview Park studio, at the location of a former Canadian Forces Base in north Toronto. The series futuristic cityscape was created by John Gajdecki and his company Gajdecki Visual Effects, blending computer-generated images with a live-action soundstage set. Two or three levels of entire futuristic environment were constructed for the production and later mixed with the CGI.

Story
Total Recall 2070 takes place in a dark, crowded, industrial and cosmopolitan setting, with a noir sci-fi aesthetic.  The government bureaucracy is heavily influenced by a small number of extremely powerful companies called "the Consortium" (including computer memory and virtual-reality vacation provider Rekall and android manufacturer Uber Braun). David Hume is a senior detective for the Citizens Protection Bureau (CPB), a police agency focused on general public safety.  After his partner is killed by self-aware androids, he is partnered against his wishes with Ian Farve, a naive officer new to the department, who is himself secretly an "Alpha Class" android—a model with a more complex psychological nature.  Hume and the CPB often have conflicts with the Assessor's Office (the investigative agency that has sole jurisdiction over crimes related to the Consortium) and with the private security forces of Consortium companies. The main story arcs of the series concern the agendas of the Consortium, the mystery of Farve's origins, Hume's wife Olivia, whose memories have been tampered with, and the mysterious manufacturer of Alpha Class androids.  Significant plot elements remain unresolved by the end of the series run, due to cancellation; a crucial story arc from the series was the suggestion that the memory expansion used on self-aware androids was part non-human DNA and that a material found by a remote base on Mars could create a hybrid of human and android DNA.

Main characters
 Michael Easton as David Hume: A CPB Detective whose original partner was killed by rogue androids. His initial highly antagonistic attitude towards androids changes once he gets to know his new partner. 
 Karl Pruner as Ian Farve: Hume's android partner. Farve is an Alpha-class prototype android, an advanced model based on synthetic cloning technology. Farve is polite and very formal. 
 Cynthia Preston as Olivia Hume: Hume's wife. In the episode "Paranoid", she discovers that false memories were implanted on her before she met her husband, which leads to their separation.
 Michael Anthony Rawlins as Martin Ehrenthal: Hume's superior at the CPB.
 Judith Krant as Olan Chang: CPB forensic pathologist and computer specialist.
 Matthew Bennett as James Calley: A representative for the Assessors Office (a more invasive future version of Internal Affairs), who often butts heads with Hume and Farve.

The Consortium

By the year 2070, Earth and Mars (as well as space stations) are ruled by a unified government known as the Interplanetary Council (IPC). However, much of the real power is held by the Consortium, composed of at least six multi-global companies that financed the colonization of Mars.

The known six companies are:
 Rekall, the information technology powerhouse of the 21st century. Rekall also provides the Operating Systems for the Androids manufactured by Uber Braun.
 Minacon, the energy supply company, provides both the oil on Earth and the deuterium on Mars.
 Tashimo-Pacific, the transport company, created "Johnny Cab."
 Uber Braun, the rocket and robotics corporation, build the service androids.
 Variable Dynamics, the medical and bio-tech company, is interested in creating synthetic humans.
 Tillman Heath advertising boards are around the city in the series. Tillman Heath is the agriculture and chemicals giant but its real purpose was not unveiled in the 1st series. Its slogan is "Bringing the world's food supply to you."

Episode list

Distribution

DVD releases
In 1999, the complete series was released on DVD in Japan (in English and dubbed in Japanese). The 2-hour series pilot ("Machine Dreams") has been available on region 1 DVD and VHS (Canada and the United States) since 2000.  The series was broadcasting in Italy as of 2010 on Fantasy channel (Sky pay-TV), dubbed in Italian language.

On February 22, 2011, Alliance Home Entertainment released the complete series for the first time on DVD (uncut) in Canada only.

Online
Since September 2009, the entire 22-episode series (in the censored US versions, and with advertising) has been available in low-resolution Flash Video format via Comcast's official Hulu-based "FanCast" streaming video online service. The whole series was also formerly available online through the beta version of the Joost online TV content distribution system.

References

External links

 

1999 Canadian television series debuts
1999 Canadian television series endings
1990s Canadian drama television series
1990s Canadian science fiction television series
Cyberpunk television series
Television series set in the 2070s
Showtime (TV network) original programming
Live action television shows based on films
Television series by Alliance Atlantis
Television series by Universal Television
Television shows filmed in Toronto
Television shows based on works by Philip K. Dick
English-language television shows
Androids in television
Fiction about memory erasure and alteration
Total Recall (1990 film)